The Lotta Crabtree Cottage (1885-86) is a Shingle style house in the Breslin Park neighborhood of Mount Arlington, New Jersey. Designed by the noted Philadelphia architect Frank Furness, it is a contributing property in Mount Arlington Historic District.

Lotta Crabtree  (1847–1924) was an American actress and comedian, best known for her Western roles. Furness designed the Breslin Hotel (1886, burned 1948) – a 175-room resort hotel built on a hill overlooking Lake Hopatcong – along with a number of summer cottages surrounding it. A popular celebrity, Crabtree "was given this house as part of promotion for the Breslin Hotel." She named it "Attol Tryst" ("Lotta" spelled backward), and summered there for 20 years.

The 18-room cottage sits on land that slopes down to Van Every Cove. It is 2-1/2 stories on the land side and 3-1/2 on the lake side. The exterior features Furness's "upside-down" chimneys, with corbels that flare outward near the top. An expansive porch/piazza, including a semi-circular section that traces the curve of the parlor, wraps around three sides of the house. The interior features Aesthetic Movement details characteristic of Furness, including a fireplace flanked by terra cotta dog-faced beasts. The billiard room's massive stone fireplace once featured a mosaic that spelled out "18 - LOTTA - 86" in gemstones.

References

External links
Mount Arlington Historic District, from Living Places
Lotta Crabtree Cottage, from Philadelphia Architects and Buildings
Lotta Crabtree Cottage, from Fine Arts Library Image Collection, University of Pennsylvania
Lotta Crabtree - the First American Superstar, from Facebook

Shingle Style houses
Shingle Style architecture in New Jersey
Frank Furness buildings
Houses completed in 1886
Houses in Morris County, New Jersey
National Register of Historic Places in Morris County, New Jersey
Mount Arlington, New Jersey